Mjej I Gnuni, was an Armenian nobleman from the Gnuni family, who served as the marzban of Persian Armenia from 518 to 548. 

Between 515 and 516, several Hunnic tribes kept making incursions into Armenia. Mjej then decided to organize a counter-attack, where he managed to successfully repel them. As a reward, the Sassanian shah Kavadh I appointed him as the marzban of Armenia in 518. According to Samuel Anetsi: "after the patrician Vard Mamikonian, brother of Vahan, the Persian marzbans ruled Armenia for 11 years. The government of Armenia then passed to Mjej of the Gnuni family, who held it for thirty years". During this period, Mjej maintained religious peace. In 527, he repelled other Hunnic invasions. In 548, he was succeeded by Gushnasp Bahram.

Sources
 
 
 

 

Year of death unknown
Sasanian governors of Armenia
Year of birth unknown
6th-century Iranian people
6th-century Armenian people
Generals of Khosrow I
Generals of Kavad I
Armenian people from the Sasanian Empire